Polichne, or Polichna (Πολίχνα), was a small town in the upper valley of the Aesepus in the ancient Troad.

Its site is unlocated.

References

Populated places in ancient Troad
Former populated places in Turkey
Lost ancient cities and towns